Unțești is a village in Ungheni District, Moldova.

Notable people
Vasile Vasilache

References

Villages of Ungheni District
Populated places on the Prut